The Chili sea catfish (Notarius troschelii) is a species of catfish in the family Ariidae. It was described by Theodore Gill in 1863, originally under the genus Sciades. It inhabits marine and brackish waters in Mexico, Costa Rica, Honduras, Ecuador, El Salvador, Colombia, Peru, Nicaragua, Guatemala, and Panama.

The chili sea catfish feeds on fish scales. It is currently ranked as Least Concern by the IUCN redlist, although its importance to commercial fisheries is cited as a possible threat to its population. Its meat is marketed fresh.

References

Ariidae
Fish described in 1863